This is a glossary of representation theory in mathematics.

The term "module" is often used synonymously for a representation; for the module-theoretic terminology, see also glossary of module theory.

See also Glossary of Lie groups and Lie algebras, list of representation theory topics and :Category:Representation theory.

Notations: We write . Thus, for example, a one-representation (i.e., a character) of a group G is of the form .

A

B

C

D

E

F

G

H

I

J

K

L

M

O

P

Q

R

S

T

U

V

W

Y

Z

Notes

References 

 Theodor Bröcker and Tammo tom Dieck, Representations of compact Lie groups, Graduate Texts in Mathematics 98, Springer-Verlag, Berlin, 1995.

D. Gaitsgory, Geometric Representation theory, Math 267y, Fall 2005

Claudio Procesi (2007) Lie Groups: an approach through invariants and representation, Springer, .

 N. Wallach, Real Reductive Groups, 2 vols., Academic Press 1988,

Further reading 
M. Duflo et M. Vergne, La formule de Plancherel des groupes de Lie semi-simples réels, in “Representations of Lie Groups;” Kyoto, Hiroshima (1986), Advanced Studies in Pure Mathematics 14, 1988.

External links 
https://math.stanford.edu/~bump/

Representation theory
 
Wikipedia glossaries using description lists